A bay is a recessed, coastal body of water that directly connects to a larger main body of water, such as an ocean, a lake, or another bay. A large bay is usually called a gulf, sea, sound, or bight. A cove is a small, circular bay with a narrow entrance. A fjord is an elongated bay formed by glacial action.

A bay can be the estuary of a river, such as the Chesapeake Bay, an estuary of the Susquehanna River. Bays may also be nested within each other; for example, James Bay is an arm of Hudson Bay in northeastern Canada. Some large bays, such as the Bay of Bengal and Hudson Bay, have varied marine geology.

The land surrounding a bay often reduces the strength of winds and blocks waves. Bays may have as wide a variety of shoreline characteristics as other shorelines. In some cases, bays have beaches, which "are usually characterized by a steep upper foreshore with a broad, flat fronting terrace". Bays were significant in the history of human settlement because they provided safe places for fishing. Later they were important in the development of sea trade as the safe anchorage they provide encouraged their selection as ports.

Definition 
The United Nations Convention on the Law of the Sea defines a bay as a well-marked indentation in the coastline, whose penetration is in such proportion to the width of its mouth as to contain land-locked waters and constitute more than a mere curvature of the coast. An indentation, however, shall not be regarded as a bay unless its area is as large as (or larger than) that of the semi-circle whose diameter is a line drawn across the mouth of that indentation — otherwise it would be referred to as a bight.

Types 

 Open bay — a bay that is widest at the mouth, flanked by headlands.
 Enclosed bay — a bay whose mouth is narrower than its widest part, flanked by at least one peninsula.
 Semi-enclosed bay — an open bay whose exit is made into narrower channels by one or more islands within its mouth.

Formation

There are various ways in which bays can form. The largest bays have developed through plate tectonics. As the super-continent Pangaea broke up along curved and indented fault lines, the continents moved apart and left large bays; these include the Gulf of Guinea, the Gulf of Mexico, and the Bay of Bengal, which is the world's largest bay.

Bays also form through coastal erosion by rivers and glaciers. A bay formed by a glacier is a fjord. Rias are created by rivers and are characterised by more gradual slopes. Deposits of softer rocks erode more rapidly, forming bays, while harder rocks erode less quickly, leaving headlands.

See also

References

 

 
Bodies of water
Coastal and oceanic landforms
Coastal geography
Oceanographical terminology